The following is a list of the 190 municipalities (comuni) of the Province of Alessandria, Piedmont, Italy.

See also 
List of municipalities of Italy

References 

Alessandria